Markus Schmidt (born 23 October 1968) is an Austrian luger who competed between 1987 and 1997. Competing in two Winter Olympics, he earned a bronze medal in the men's singles event at Albertville in 1992.

Schmidt also won two medals in the mixed team event at the FIL World Luge Championships with a gold in 1996 and a silver in 1991. He also won two silver medals in the mixed team event at the 1992 FIL European Luge Championships in Winterberg, Germany and 1996 FIL European Luge Championships in Sigulda, Latvia, bronze medal in the mixed team event at the 1994 FIL European Luge Championships in Königssee, Germany and bronze medal in the men's singles event at the 1996 FIL European Luge Championships in Sigulda, Latvia.

References
1994 luge men's singles results
FIL-Luge profile
Fuzilogik Sports – Winter Olympic results – Men's luge
Hickoksports.com results on Olympic champions in luge and skeleton.
Hickok sports information on World champions in luge and skeleton.
List of European luge champions

External links
 
 
 

1968 births
Living people
Austrian male lugers
Olympic lugers of Austria
Olympic bronze medalists for Austria
Lugers at the 1992 Winter Olympics
Lugers at the 1994 Winter Olympics
Olympic medalists in luge
Medalists at the 1992 Winter Olympics